Martine Leavitt is a Canadian American writer of young adult novels and a creative writing instructor.

Biography

Leavitt was born in 1953 in Canada. She received a Bachelor of Arts degree, first class honours, from the University of Calgary and a Master of Fine Arts from Vermont College. She has seven children, twenty grandchildren, and lives with her husband in Alberta, Canada.

Martine Leavitt writes novels for young adults, most recently Calvin, which won the Governor General's Literary Award of Canada. My Book of Life by Angel was a finalist for the Los Angeles Times Book Prize, and winner of the Canadian Library Association Young Adult Book of the Year. Keturah and Lord Death was a finalist for the National Book Award. Her next book, Buffalo Flats, will be out in spring 2023.

She teaches creative writing at Vermont College of Fine Arts, a short-residency MFA program.

Selected works

Novels 

 The Dragon's Tapestry (1992)
 Prism Moon (1993)
 The Taker's Key (1998)
 The Dollmage (2001)
 Tom Finder (2003)
 Heck Superhero (2004)
 Keturah and Lord Death (2006)
 My Book of Life by Angel (2012)
 Blue Mountain (2014)
 Calvin (2015)

Awards

 Calvin received the 2016 Governor General's Literary Award in the Young People's Literature (Text) category.
 Calvin won the Whitney Awards General Youth Fiction category for 2015.
 My Book of Life by Angel won the Canadian Library Association Young Adult Book Award in 2013.
 My Book of Life by Angel was a Junior Library Guild selection in 2013.
 My Book of Life by Angel a Booklist Best Book of the Year in 2013.
 My Book of Life by Angel was named a Cooperative Children's Book Center (CCBC) Best Book of the Year in 2013.
 My Book of Life by Angel was named a Quill and Quire book of the year in 2013.
 My Book of Life by Angel was a Los Angeles Times Book Prize Finalist in 2012.
 My Book of Life by Angel was listed as a Horn Book fanfare book in 2012.
 Keturah and Lord Death was awarded the White Pine Award in 2008.
 Heck Superhero'''s Italian translation Bella la mia vita da Supereroe (Salani Editore) was a Premio Paolo Ungari UNICEF finalist in 2008.
 Keturah and Lord Death was awarded a blue ribbon from The Bulletin of the Center for Children's Books.
 Keturah and Lord Death was a New York Public Library Book for the Teen Age selection in 2007.
 Keturah and Lord Death was a finalist for the National Book Award in 2006.
 Keturah and Lord Death was selected a Chicago Public Library Best of the Best Books in 2006.
 Keturah and Lord Death was a Booklist Editors' Choice (ALA) in 2006.
 Keturah and Lord Death was winner of ForeWord Magazine Book of the Year Bronze Award in 2006.
 Keturah and Lord Death was a Junior Library Guild Premier Selection in 2006.
 Heck Superhero was selected as a Best Books for Young Adults (ALA) in 2005.
 Heck Superhero was a finalist for the 2004 Governor General's Awards.
 Heck Superhero was a Kirkus Reviews Editor's Choice in 2004.
 Tom Finder won a Benjamin Franklin Award in 2004.
 Tom Finder won the Mr. Christie Award in 2003.
 The Dollmage was an ALA Best Book for Young Adults in 2003.
 The Taker's Key received the Association for Mormon Letters Award for young adult literature in 1998.
 The Dragon's Tapestry'' received the Association for Mormon Letters Award for young adult literature in 1993.

References

Interviews
  Smith, Cynthia Leitich. "Author Interview: Martine Leavitt on My Book of Life by Angel." Sept. 6, 2012.
 Ellis, Ann Dee. "Vermont College Week." Throwing Up Words. Feb. 5, 2010.
 "An Interview with Two Published Writers." Inkless. March 2009.
 "Questions to Martine Leavitt about her novel Tom Finder." Connecting Education.
 "The Power of Poetry: Carol McAfee Talks to Martine Leavitt About How Poetry Can Improve Our Prose." Cynsations.

External links

 
 
 
Mormon Literature Database entry

People from Taber, Alberta 
Writers from Alberta
1953 births
Living people
Converts to Mormonism
Latter Day Saints from Vermont
Canadian Latter Day Saints
Brigham Young University faculty
University of Calgary alumni
Vermont College of Fine Arts alumni
Canadian children's writers
20th-century Canadian novelists
21st-century Canadian novelists
Canadian fantasy writers
Canadian women short story writers
Canadian women novelists
20th-century American novelists
21st-century American novelists
American children's writers
American fantasy writers
American women short story writers
American women novelists
Canadian women children's writers
American women children's writers
Women science fiction and fantasy writers
20th-century Canadian women writers
21st-century Canadian women writers
20th-century American short story writers
21st-century American short story writers
Governor General's Award-winning children's writers
Novelists from Utah
Latter Day Saints from Utah
Canadian emigrants to the United States
21st-century American women writers